Pablo Gabino Rey Sendón (known artistically as Pablo Rey) is a Spanish painter artist born in Barcelona in 1968.

Early life

He grew up into a family of artists, Rey began learning the art of painting from the hand of his father, the Spanish realist painter Gabino Rey. In 1989, he received the Talens prize, in the contest of young painters at the Sala Parés Gallery (Barcelona), and in 1992, he won the Raimon Maragall i Noble prize in the same contest. In 1994 the University of Barcelona acquired in open call one of his works for the patrimony collection. In 1994 he graduated in Fine Arts from the Barcelona University.

Career
In 1996, Rey moved to New York City to live and work. In 1997, he participated in The Grammercy International Art Fair in New York, with the gallery Pierogi 2000 and was selected along with other artists from New York to participate in the exhibition "New Tide" at the Williamsburg Art & Historical Center in Brooklyn, New York. In 1998, he was selected along with Juan Uslé, Francisco Leiro, Pello Irazu, Antonio Murado, Victoria Civera and other artists to participate in the documentary film 98 IN NY produced by Canal +, about Spanish artists in New York.

In 1999, Rey traveled by car from New York to Texas, from this trip he made a series of works titled NY-TX, to exhibit in the Holland Tunnel Art Projects gallery in New York City in June 2000. In 2004, the exhibition "Two painters on the same canvas," was presented with painter Luis Trullenque in Benedormiens castle in Santa Cristina d’ Aro in Girona.

In 2005 at the presentation of the exhibition "Complementary States" at the Carmen Tatché Gallery, the philosopher and sociologist of art Arnau Puig presented the catalog-text "Painting set free and freedom in the painting of Pablo Rey", introductory essay to the art and aesthetic concept of the work from the Barcelona's artist, starting from and based on the series of paintings from said exhibition. In the same act the critic and art historian Pilar Giró stated that Pablo Rey is a singular voice in the Spanish art scene and has managed to reconcile rationality and lyricism in his work.

In 2009, Rey presented in Sant Feliu de Guíxols the exhibition Conjuncions three painters on the same canvas, with painters Alex Pallí and Luis Trullenque. Exhibition that was inaugurated that summer in the old monastery of Sant Feliu de Guíxols and in 2011 it traveled to the House of Culture of Gerona.

In 2013 he held an individual exhibition entitled 'Recent Work' at the Fundació Casa Josep Irla, in Sant Feliu de Guíxols, Costa Brava, Gerona and in 2014 he toke part in the exhibition ' Framed ', in the Holland Tunnel gallery from New York.

Featured exhibitions 
The Catalan painter has had numerous other exhibitions, most notably those of the Williamsburg Art & Historical Center in Brooklyn, New York. 76Varick Gallery, New York City. Gallery of The Nederlandche Bank of Amsterdam. IX Biennial Art City of Oviedo. Holland Tunnel Art Projects in New York City. Lewisham Art House, London. And MundoArt Gallery in Laren, Amsterdam.

Gallery

References

Annexes

Bibliography 
 Pilar Giró, Arnau Puig, Carles Lapuente - Pablo Rey, Pinturas / Paintings 1996-2008 -  SAP Editor, Madrid, 2008. . MNCARS library, Reina Sofía National Art Center Museum | Library Museum of Contemporary Art of Barcelona | Library of Galician Center for Contemporary Art | Library of University of the Basque Country | Library of the University of Fine Arts of Seville | Library Jacques Dupin, Joan Miró Foundation | Library CRAI Fine Arts, University of Barcelona | Library of Fine Arts, Complutense University, Madrid

External links 

 Official website: Pablo Rey Painter Artist 2019.
 Biography: Pablo Rey. 2019.
 Exhibitions: Pablo Rey. 2019.
 Essay; Painting set free and freedom in the painting of Pablo Rey, by Arnau Puig (Philosopher, critic and art sociologist). On academia.edu
 Interview: with Pilar Giró (Curator and art critic)
 Essay; Pablo Rey: The Nature of Painting (2008), by Pilar Giró (Historian and art critic). On academia.edu
 Conversation: Extracts from a conversation with Pablo Rey, by Carles Lapuente (Poet) 2008. On academia.edu
 Press article; Pablo Rey: Fidelitat a la pintura. by Eudald Camps (Art critic) 2012.
 Catalogue:  Pablo Rey, Complementary states Carmen Tatché Gallery (2005) - Library of the Centro Galego de Arte Contemporaneo, Santiago de Compostela.
 Monograph: Pablo Rey, Pinturas / Paintings 1996-2008 SAP Editor, Madrid (2008) - MACBA library, Museo d'Art Contemporani de Barcelona, BCN.
 Bibliography: Pablo Rey. 2019.
 Arteinformado: Pablo Rey Artist. (Ibero-American art space)
 Wikiart: Pablo Rey

1968 births
Spanish contemporary artists
20th-century Spanish painters
20th-century Spanish male artists
Spanish male painters
21st-century Spanish painters
Painters from Catalonia
Painters from Barcelona
Abstract painters
Living people
Contemporary painters
21st-century Spanish male artists